Thomas Eugene Kurtz (born February 22, 1928) is a retired Dartmouth professor of mathematics and computer scientist, who along with his colleague John G. Kemeny set in motion the then revolutionary concept of making computers as freely available to college students as library books were, by implementing the concept of time-sharing at Dartmouth College. In his mission to allow non-expert users to interact with the computer, he co-developed the BASIC programming language (Beginners All-purpose Symbolic Instruction Code) and the Dartmouth Time Sharing System during 1963 to 1964.

A native of Oak Park, Illinois, United States, Kurtz graduated from Knox College in 1950, and was awarded a Ph.D. degree from Princeton University in 1956, where his advisor was John Tukey, and joined the Mathematics Department of Dartmouth College that same year, where he taught statistics and numerical analysis.

In 1983, Kurtz and Kemeny co-founded a company called True BASIC, Inc. to market True BASIC, an updated version of the language.

Kurtz has also served as Council Chairman and Trustee of EDUCOM, as well as Trustee and Chairman of NERComP, and on the Pierce Panel of the President's Scientific Advisory Committee. Kurtz also served on the steering committees for the CONDUIT project and the CCUC conferences on instructional computing.

In 1974, the American Federation of Information Processing Societies gave an award to Kurtz and Kemeny at the National Computer Conference for their work on BASIC and time-sharing. In 1991, the Computer Society honored Kurtz with the IEEE Computer Pioneer Award, and in 1994, he was inducted as a Fellow of the Association for Computing Machinery.

Early life and education
In 1951, Kurtz' first experience with computing came at the Summer Session of the Institute for Numerical Analysis at University of California, Los Angeles. His interests have included numerical analysis, statistics, and computer science ever since. He graduated in 1950 when he obtained his bachelor's degree majoring in mathematics and in 1956, at the age of 28, he went on to acquire his PhD from Princeton University. His thesis was on a problem of multiple comparisons in mathematical statistics. Kurtz composed his first computer program in 1951 while working with computers at UCLA in the institute of numerical analysis. He performed this feat just after finishing grad school and one year into his tuition at Princeton University.

Dartmouth
In 1963 to 1964, Kurtz and Kemeny developed the first version of the Dartmouth Time-Sharing System, a time-sharing system for university use, and the BASIC language.

From 1966 to 1975, Kurtz served as Director of the Kiewit Computation Center at Dartmouth, and from 1975 to 1978, Director of the Office of Academic Computing. From 1980 to 1988 Kurtz was Director of the Computer and Information Systems program at Dartmouth, a ground-breaking multidisciplinary graduate program to develop information system (IS) leaders for industry. Subsequently, Kurtz returned to teaching full-time as a Professor of Mathematics, with an emphasis on statistics and computer science.

BASIC
As part of the Dartmouth Time-Sharing System, Kemeny and Kurtz created the BASIC programming language. The very first BASIC program ran on May 1, 1964 at 4 a.m., and neither Kemeny nor Kurtz thought of this as a start to something grand. They merely hoped it would help students learn something about the computers they were using. The pair made certain that their invention was immediately dispersed to the public and made no real money from it. Dartmouth College copyrighted BASIC; however it made BASIC available and free to anyone wanting to use it. The name for the language originated from Kurtz's wish to have a simple acronym that meant something as well. Kurtz states that, “We wanted a word that was simple but not simple-minded, and BASIC was that one.” BASIC along with the books published on it earned a lot of positive feedback, for example: “This second edition of Basic Programming gives a thorough description of BASIC, which is useful not only for the beginner, but also for the more experienced programmer.” “My overall evaluation of BASIC programming is that it is ideal for the individual who wishes to program with a minimum of effort and of equal value for group or classroom instruction.”

The theme that BASIC was for the average computer user is stressed by Kurtz. In an open letter he reiterates upon past statements that BASIC was invented to give students a simple programming language that was easy to learn, as all the current languages of the time were dedicated to professionals. He then went on to say that BASIC was for people who did not want to dedicate their lives to programming. The repetition of this idea by Kurtz accentuates that even through all of his success the language he wrote would remain implemented for the masses and not just specialists.

BASIC standards were created in the 1980s for the ECMA, and ANSI with their versions being released in 1986 and 1987 respectively. BASIC popularity skyrocketed in 1975 after a pair of youngsters in a Harvard dormitory, Bill Gates and Paul Allen, created a version of BASIC that was viable on one of the earliest personal computers. Gates and Allen's version became the most prominent iterations of BASIC.

His work on BASIC was recognized by the IEEE as part of their milestone program which marks historic places for human innovation from around the world. Places honored include Thomas Edison’s lab in Menlo Park, New Jersey, where he invented the light bulb and phonograph, and the hilltop outside Bologna, Italy where Guglielmo Marconi sent the first transatlantic radio transmission. The plaque was placed on 22 February 2021.

Influence
The road to BASIC itself was a long one. Kemeny and Kurtz had forged DARSIMCO – Dartmouth Simplified Code – Dartmouth's inaugural attempt at making a computing language in 1956; however DARSIMCO soon became obsolete when the language FORTRAN manifested itself. In 1962 Kemeny and a Dartmouth undergraduate, Sidney Marshall, created the language DOPE, Dartmouth Oversimplified Programming Experiment, which was a direct predecessor of BASIC. DOPE itself was little used, and Kurtz preferred trying to implement successful languages such as FORTRAN and ALGOL. Kurtz's experience with Dartmouth ALGOL 30 for the LGP-30 convinced him that devising subsets of these languages was not quite practical, and this led him to adopt Kemeny's notion of creating a new language entirely.

Critics
Although BASIC was widely regarded as a success, many computing professionals thought it was a poor choice for larger and more complicated programs. Larger programs became confusing and messy when they used the “GO TO” statement to jump from one line of a program to another. A further criticism of the original language was that it was unstructured, which made it difficult to split programs into separate parts to improve readability. BASIC not being structured also hindered the ability to debug and modify parts of the code, and this limited its use by larger companies. Hence it largely remained a language used for only smaller programs.

True BASIC

In 1983, in response to a proliferation of "Street BASICs," a group of graduating Dartmouth students persuaded Kemeny and Kurtz to offer the Dartmouth version of the language as a commercial product. The first offering of their company, True Basic, Inc., was based on Dartmouth BASIC 7, which featured modern programming constructs such as “IF..THEN..ELSE, DO..LOOP and EXIT DO”.  The company described its product as “Simple. Elegant. Powerful. True BASIC.“ Upon Kemeny's advice, True BASIC was not limited to a single OS or computer system. “Today versions of True BASIC are available for DOS, macOS, Windows, Unix, and Linux systems”. When Kurtz retired from Dartmouth College in 1993, he continued to develop and maintain True Basic.

See also
 New Hampshire Historical Marker No. 261: BASIC: The First User-Friendly Computer Programming Language

References

External links
Alumni Page
A Guide to Thomas E. Kurtz Papers
About his 1991 Computer Pioneer Award

1928 births
American computer scientists
BASIC programming language
Dartmouth College faculty
Fellows of the Association for Computing Machinery
Knox College (Illinois) alumni
Living people
Princeton University alumni
Programming language designers